was a Japanese athlete. He competed in the men's long jump at the 1936 Summer Olympics.

References

External links
 

1912 births
1986 deaths
Athletes (track and field) at the 1936 Summer Olympics
Japanese male long jumpers
Olympic athletes of Japan
Place of birth missing